Lake Miers is a small lake in Miers Valley, Antarctica, lying  east of the snouts of Miers Glacier and Adams Glacier, and filled by meltwater from these glaciers. A stream from the lake flows down the valley in the warmest weather to reach the coast of Victoria Land. The lake was named after Miers Glacier in 1957 by the New Zealand Blue Glacier Party of the Commonwealth Trans-Antarctic Expedition, 1956–58.

References

Lakes of Victoria Land
McMurdo Dry Valleys